Tazehabad (also Romanized as Tāzehābād; also known as Tāzehābād-e Kūrel) is a village in Zirtang Rural District, Kunani District, Kuhdasht County, Lorestan Province, Iran. At the 2006 census, its population was 172, in 37 families.

References 

Towns and villages in Kuhdasht County